Angie Estes is an American poet, and professor at Ashland University.

She graduated from the University of Oregon with an M.A. and Ph.D. in English.
She taught at California Polytechnic State University, Oberlin College, and Ohio State University. 
Her work has appeared in Boston Review, Paris Review, Ploughshares, and TriQuarterly.

Awards
 Pushcart Prize
 Cecil Hemley Memorial Award, Poetry Society of America
 National Endowment for the Humanities Fellowship
 National Endowment for the Arts Fellowship 
 Woodrow Wilson Foundation Fellowship
 California Arts Council Fellowship
 MacDowell Colony residency
 Ohio Arts Council grant
 2001 FIELD Poetry Prize
 2001 Alice Fay di Castagnola Prize, from the Poetry Society of America
 2010 Guggenheim Fellowship

Works
"Proverbs", Verse Daily
Tryst, Oberlin College Press, 2009, 
Chez Nous, Oberlin College Press, 2005, 
Voice-Over, Oberlin College Press, 2002, 
The Uses of Passion (Peregrine Smith Books, 1995)

Anthologies
"Kind of Blue", Cap City Poets, Pudding House Publications, 2008, 
"Now and Again: The Autobiography of Basket", The Extraordinary Tide, Columbia University Press, 2001, 
"Nocturne"; Serenade", Geography of Home, Heyday Books, 1999, 
Queer Dog, Cleis Press, 1997,

References

External links
Author's website
"Something like truth: an interview with Angie Estes", Smile Politely, Caleb Curtiss, March 2, 2010

1950 births
Living people
University of Oregon alumni
California Polytechnic State University faculty
Oberlin College faculty
Ohio State University faculty
Ashland University faculty
National Endowment for the Arts Fellows
American women poets
American women academics
21st-century American women